Kinnier is a surname. Notable people with the surname include:

Douglas Reid Kinnier (1858–1916), British seaman
Keith Robert Martin Kinnier (1902–1969), British seaman